Mukim Gadong 'B' is a mukim in Brunei-Muara District. Brunei. The population was 33,637 in 2016.

Background 
The mukim was established on 21 November 2005 with split of the former Mukim Gadong into this mukim and Mukim Gadong 'A'.

Geography 
The mukim is located in the central western part of the district, bordering Mukim Gadong 'A' to the north, Mukim Berakas 'A' to the north-east, Mukim Kianggeh to the east and south and Mukim Kilanas to the south and west.

Demographics 
As of 2016 census, the population of Mukim Gadong 'B' comprised 17,044 males and 16,593 females. The mukim had 6,710 households occupying 6,639 dwellings. The entire population lived in urban areas.

Settlements 
Mukim Gadong 'B' encompsses the following settlements:

 Kampong Beribi
 Kampong Kiarong
 Kampong Kiulap
 Kampong Mata-Mata
 Kampong Menglait
 Kampong Pengkalan Gadong
 Kampong Perpindahan Mata-Mata
 STKRJ Katok 'B'
Gadong commercial area is located within Bandar Seri Begawan.

References 

Gadong 'B'
Brunei-Muara District